Gnathophis is a genus of marine congrid eels.

Species
There are currently 27 recognized species in this genus:

 Gnathophis andriashevi Karmovskaya, 1990
 Gnathophis asanoi Karmovskaya, 2004
 Gnathophis bathytopos D. G. Smith & Kanazawa, 1977 (blackgut conger)
 Gnathophis bracheatopos D. G. Smith & Kanazawa, 1977 (longeye conger)
 Gnathophis capensis (Kaup, 1856) (Southern Atlantic conger)
 Gnathophis castlei Karmovskaya & Paxton, 2000 (Castle's conger)
 Gnathophis cinctus (Garman, 1899) (hardtail conger)
 Gnathophis codoniphorus Maul, 1972
 Gnathophis grahami Karmovskaya & Paxton, 2000 (Graham's conger)
 Gnathophis habenatus (J. Richardson, 1848) (little conger eel)
 Gnathophis heterognathos (Bleeker, 1858–59)
 Gnathophis heterolinea (Kotthaus, 1968)
 Gnathophis leptosomatus Karrer, 1982
 Gnathophis longicauda (E. P. Ramsay & J. D. Ogilby, 1888) (little conger)
 Gnathophis macroporis Karmovskaya & Paxton, 2000 (largepore conger)
 Gnathophis melanocoelus Karmovskaya & Paxton, 2000 (blackgut conger)
 Gnathophis microps Karmovskaya & Paxton, 2000 (smalleye conger)
 Gnathophis musteliceps (Alcock, 1894)
 Gnathophis mystax (Delaroche, 1809) (thinlip conger)
 Gnathophis nasutus Karmovskaya & Paxton, 2000
 Gnathophis neocaledoniensis Karmovskaya, 2004
 Gnathophis nystromi (D. S. Jordan & Snyder, 1901)
 Gnathophis nystromi ginanago (Asano, 1958)
 Gnathophis nystromi nystromi (D. S. Jordan & Snyder, 1901)
 Gnathophis parini Karmovskaya, 1990
 Gnathophis smithi Karmovskaya, 1990
 Gnathophis tritos D. G. Smith & Kanazawa, 1977
 Gnathophis umbrellabius (Whitley, 1946) (umbrella conger)
 Gnathophis xenica (Matsubara & Ochiai, 1951)

References

 Tony Ayling & Geoffrey Cox, Collins Guide to the Sea Fishes of New Zealand,  (William Collins Publishers Ltd, Auckland, New Zealand 1982) 

 
Congridae
Danian first appearances
Extant Danian first appearances